Scary World Theory is the second studio album by German electronic music band Lali Puna. It was released on 15 October 2001 by Morr Music.

Track listing

Personnel
Credits are adapted from the album's liner notes.

Lali Puna
 Valerie Trebeljahr
 Markus Acher
 Christoph Brandner
 Florian Zimmer

Additional musicians
 Osamu Nambu – violin

Production
 Michael Heilrath – mastering
 Mario Thaler – production, mixing, recording

Design
 Jan Kruse – cover artwork
 O8 Design – cover artwork

References

External links
 

2001 albums
Lali Puna albums
Morr Music albums